Paranthidium jugatorium is a species of bee in the family Megachilidae. It is found in Central America and North America.

Subspecies
These four subspecies belong to the species Paranthidium jugatorium:
 Paranthidium jugatorium butleri Snelling, 1962
 Paranthidium jugatorium jugatorium (Say, 1824)
 Paranthidium jugatorium lepidum (Cresson, 1878)
 Paranthidium jugatorium perpictum (Cockerell, 1898)

References

Further reading

External links

 

Megachilidae
Articles created by Qbugbot
Insects described in 1824